is an adult-themed adventure video game released in Japan on October 18, 1991 by FairyTale under the name X-Shitei. A controversial event related to the game resulted in the establishment of the Ethics Organization of Computer Software (EOCS). The incident changed the Japanese bishōjo game industry and few games such as Rance remained popular.

Gameplay
Saori is a first-person adventure game. The player's interaction is confined to repeatedly selecting context-specific options until the next event is triggered. In the beginning of the game the player only has access to one room. Repeatedly visiting rooms triggers new scenes and eventually unlocks other rooms.

Plot
A teenage girl named Saori is abducted by a sadistic woman who locks her in a mysterious mansion. By visiting the rooms within, Saori unlocks erotic memories of its inhabitants, ultimately exposing them to the owner's cruel pleasures.

Controversy
A copy of the game was stolen by a junior high school student from the Kyoto Metropolitan Area in 1991. Additionally, Japanese authorities authorized a search warrant at JAST and four other resellers in its vicinity due to the amount of graphic content in the game. This resulted in the presidents of JAST and Kirara, the latter being the owner of the FairyTale brand, being arrested by police on November 25, 1991 on charges of possession of obscene material with intent to resell. Shortly after, FairyTale recalled all copies of this game and any others that would be found at fault in the eyes of the law, and re-released them with self-censorship. The titles in question included Dragon City X-Shitei, Tenshi-tachi no Gogo 3: Bangai-hen, and Tenshi-tachi no Gogo 4: Yuko.

References

1991 video games
Adventure games
Bishōjo games
Japan-exclusive video games
FM Towns games
NEC PC-9801 games
X68000 games
Censored video games
Video game controversies
Video games developed in Japan
Video games featuring female protagonists